M'bilia Bel  (born January 10, 1959) is a rumba and world music singer from the Democratic Republic of the Congo. She is known as the "Queen of Congolese and African Rumba". She rose to fame after first being discovered by Sam Manguana and later by Tabu Ley Rochereau who helped her gain confidence, master her powerful soprano voice, and achieve acclaim as one of the best Congolese female singers.

Biography
M'bilia Bel became successful in the early 1980s when she joined Tabu Ley Rochereau's band (Afrisa International). They made several albums together. In the mid-1980s, the birth of their first child prompted her to take a break from performing for a year; however, after her last album with Tabu Ley in 1988, she moved to Paris. There she started working with guitarist Rigo Star Bamundele and, between 1989 and 1990, toured the United States, Europe, and West Africa.

Musical career
At the age of seventeen, Mbilia Bel began her performing career, singing as a backup singer for Abeti Masikini, the "Queen of Perfumed Soukous," and later with Sam Mangwana. As Tabu Ley's protegee, she leveraged his composing genius and her own voice to produce many hits for l'Orchestre Afrisa International. Mbilia Bel's first song with Afrisa, released in 1981, was "Mpeve Ya Longo" ("Holy Spirit" in Kikongo), a moving song about spousal abuse. In the song, she tells the story of a woman who had been abandoned by her husband and has to raise her children by herself. The song was popular, especially among women in Zaire.

Her music
Mbilia Bel's first album, released in 1982, was Eswi yo wapi. The title song, which roughly translates to "Where did it hurt you?", was composed by both Tabu Ley and M'bilia Bel. The song won the award for the best song of 1982 in Zaire, and M'bilia Bel won the award for best newcomer. Other songs on the album such as Tabu Ley's "Lisanga ya Bambanda", "Kelhia", and Dino Vangu's "Quelle Mechancete" were big hits for Afrisa International. Afrisa's popularity began to rival that of Franco's band TP.OK Jazz, thanks to the arrival of the woman who was referred to as "The Cleopatra of Congolese music". M'bilia Bel quickly became the main attraction at Afrisa's concerts in the Congo and wherever they toured, often whipping huge crowds into a frenzy when she joined the Rocherettes (dancers) in their routines. By the mid-1980s, Mbilia bel officially married Tabu Ley and gave birth to a daughter named Melody Tabu.

Mbilia Bel's songs continued to dominate the Congolese music scene, among them "Mobali na ngai wana" ("This Husband of Mine"), composed by Tabu Ley and Roger Izeidi, an adaptation of a traditional song in Lingala with a Rap/animation of Bayanzi. In the song, M'bilia Bel praises her husband as being handsome and successful and stresses that even though he has the opportunity to choose from any of Kinshasa's beautiful women, he chose her. Other songs that dominated the charts during her reign in Afrisa included "Balle a terre", "Bameli soy", "Ba gerants ya Mabala", "Keyna", "Cadence Mudanda", "Bafosami", "Nakei Nairobi", "Ba jeux de Coin", "Paka Wewe", "Boya Ye", "Yamba Ngai", "ShaWuri Yako"  "Beyanga", and "La Beaute D'une Femme".

In 1987, Tabu Ley recruited another female artist to accompany M'bilia Bel. Kishila Ngoyi was known as "Faya Tess".  It was with this new line-up that Afrisa embarked on a tour of East Africa that took in Kenya, Tanzania and Rwanda, culminating in the album Nadina, which had Lingala and Swahili versions of the title song. The tour was well received. M'bilia Bel took center stage, overshadowing other Afrisa artists including Ndombe Opetum, who had returned from T.P OK Jazz.  Upon their return to Kinshasa, rumours started surfacing about a rift between Tabu ley and M'bilia Bel. Both publicly denied having any problems when they were interviewed by journalists.

Solo career 
M'bilia Bel quit the band late in early 1988 to embark on a solo career. She briefly utilized a Gabonese producer in Libreville before leaving for Paris, where she joined guitarist Rigo Star Bamundele. Her first album with Rigo Star, entitled Phénomène, was a huge success in Kinshasa as well as abroad. Subsequent releases such as Desolé, 8/10 Benedicta, Yalowa, and Exploration met with limited success.

Following the departure of M'bilia Bel, the popularity of Afrisa International as a band decreased substantially. Tabu Ley himself seemed to lose inspiration for composing as is evidenced by the substantial reduction in the number of albums released. With the exception of her debut album, Phénomène, Mbilia Bel's career also lost energy when she left Afrisa. She lived in Paris for almost six years to expand her European horizons, but in 1996, M'bilia Bel decided to return home to try to regain her place in the Congolese music scene. This time she approached Maestro Suzy Kaseya, well-known for his work with another Congolese singer, Tshala Muana. In 2001, M'bilia Bel and Suzy released a CD of 10 tracks entitled Welcome, a huge success that won her a "Kora Award" for Best Female Vocalist of Central African. Tshala Muana received the same award in the same year.

In 2004, M'bilia Bel and Suzy Kaseya released their second collaboration Belissimo, but the album was not a success. The local Congolese press accused the singer of neglecting to promote the album by refusing to meet with them that year. M'bilia Bel's title as Queen of Congolese rumba was also threatened by the ascent of young singers such as Mj 30 and Cindy Le Coeur.  However, by 2009 she was collaborating with Lutumaba Simaro, one of the guitar masters of Congolese rumba, to interpret his song "Mobali Ya Bato", which quickly topped the charts. In 2010, M'bilia Bel traveled to Canada and Colombia for concerts. When she performed at the 3rd Afro-Colombian Champeta Festival in Cartagena with guitarist Lokassa Ya Mbongo, the then mayor Judith Pinedo Flórez gave her the key to city.

After this tour,  M'bilia Bel released a 2011 CD called The Queen with 13 songs, including a special track "Immigration Fatale", a song by singer Nyboma about the death of African children who cross the Mediterranean Sea in search of a better life in Europe.

In 2020 she appeared as one of the main acts at Festival Amani where she was appreciated by the 36,000 attendees. Her set included the hits Mpeve ya Longo and Yamba Nga from the 1980s.

Discography

Albums 

Contributing artist
2008: The Rough Guide to Congo Gold (World Music Network)

References

1959 births
Living people
20th-century Democratic Republic of the Congo women singers
Soukous musicians
21st-century Democratic Republic of the Congo women singers
21st-century Democratic Republic of the Congo people